was a town located in Sayō District, Hyōgo Prefecture, Japan.

On October 1, 2005, Nankō, along with the towns of Kōzuki and Mikazuki (all from Sayō District), was merged into the expanded town of Sayō.

Dissolved municipalities of Hyōgo Prefecture
Sayō, Hyōgo